Prove It may refer to:

Prove It (album), an album by The Expendables 
"Prove It", a song by Randie Evretts and Horace Ott (appears on album Aretha Arrives)
"Prove It" (song), a song by the band Television
"Prove It", a song by Jolin Tsai for the 2003 album Magic
"Prove It", a song by the Bicycles for the 2008 album Oh No, It's Love
Prove It!, an English educational children's TV series
Prove It (horse), American Thoroughbred racehorse
 "Prove It," a 1999 episode from the 4th season of the Arthur TV series